Macrourimegatrema is a genus of trematodes in the family Opecoelidae.

Species
Macrourimegatrema brayi Blend, Dronen & Armstrong, 2004
Macrourimegatrema gadoma Blend, Dronen & Armstrong, 2007

References

Opecoelidae
Plagiorchiida genera